XHACC-FM is a radio station on 93.3 FM in Puerto Escondido, Oaxaca, known as La Voz del Puerto.

History
XEACC-AM 870 received its concession on April 10, 1979. It was owned by Miguel Olvera Monroy until 2005.

XEACC received approval to migrate to FM in May 2013.

References

Radio stations in Oaxaca
Radio stations in Mexico with continuity obligations